Ray Stone (born 6 June 1997) is an Australian professional rugby league footballer who plays as a  for the Dolphins in the NRL.

He previously played for the Parramatta Eels in the National Rugby League.

Background
Stone was born in Moss Vale, New South Wales, Australia.  Stone grew up in Moss Vale, and played junior football for Moss Vale Dragons in CRL competition. In 2015, Stone was selected in the Australian schoolboys team. He played for the Wests Tigers until the end of the 2016 season, playing SG Ball and Holden Cup.

In 2017, Stone was signed by the Parramatta Eels for under 20s, playing Lock for the majority of the season including in the Holden Cup Grand Final, while also playing for Wentworthville in the Intrust Super Premiership appearing in nine games off the bench and at lock. Stone was picked for the 20s Junior Kangaroos team and New South Wales under 20s state of origin team.

Playing career

2018
Stone was re-signed to Parramatta's 30 man squad for the 2018 season, playing as a consistent starter for Wentworthville, appearing in 14 games with 2 tries. In round 22 of the 2018 NRL season, Stone made his NRL debut for Parramatta against the Melbourne Storm in a 20-4 defeat.

2019
On St. George's Day in round 6 of the 2019 NRL season, Stone played in the opening game of the new Western Sydney Stadium in a 51-6 win against the Wests Tigers. Stone re-signed with Parramatta until the end of the 2020 NRL season.

Stone made a total of 6 appearances for Parramatta in the 2019 NRL season. Stone played for Parramatta in their 58-0 victory over the Brisbane Broncos in the elimination final.  Stone then played for the club's feeder side the Wentworthville Magpies in their Canterbury Cup NSW grand final defeat against Newtown at Bankwest Stadium.

On November 4, 2019, Stone signed a one-year contract extension with Parramatta for the 2020 season.

2020
In round 7 of the 2020 NRL season, Stone scored his first try in the top grade as Parramatta defeated Canberra 25-24 in golden
point extra-time at Western Sydney Stadium.

2021
Stone played nine games for Parramatta in the 2021 NRL season as the club finished sixth on the table and qualified for the finals.  Stone played in both finals matches for Parramatta including their 8-6 loss to Penrith in week two.  Stone made numerous errors during the game including three crucial handling mistakes.

On 7 December, Dolphins announced that Stone will be joining their team for their inaugural 2023 season.

2022
In round 3 of the 2022 NRL season, Stone scored two tries for Parramatta including the winning try in golden point extra-time as the club defeated Melbourne 28-24 at AAMI Park.
When scoring the match winning try, Stone tore his ACL, ending his season. "Ray Stone has today been ruled out for the 2022 season following confirmation that he has ruptured his anterior cruciate ligaments (ACL) during Saturday nights game against Melbourne" a club statement said. "He will undergo surgery in the coming days and then begin his rehabilitation for the 2023 season."

2023
Stone made his club debut for the newly admitted Dolphins team in round 1 of the 2023 NRL season coming off the bench as they pulled off a big upset defeating the Sydney Roosters 28-18 at Lang Park.

References

External links

Parramatta Eels profile
NRL profile
ISP profile

1997 births
Living people
Australian rugby league players
Parramatta Eels players
Dolphins (NRL) players
Rugby league locks
Rugby league players from New South Wales
Wentworthville Magpies players